"If I Could Fly" is a song by Helloween from their album The Dark Ride. The phrase may also refer to:
If I Could Fly, an album by British dance music act Grace.
"If I Could Fly", a song by Bradley Joseph from his album One Deep Breath
"If I Could Fly", a song by Grace from their album If I Could Fly
"If I Could Fly", a song by Joe Satriani from his album Is There Love in Space?
"If I Could Fly", a song by OceanLab from the album Sirens of the Sea
"If I Could Fly", a song by One Direction from their album Made in the A.M.